Mohd Badrul Hisyam bin Morris (born 6 July 1987) is a Malaysian footballer who plays for Felcra FC in Malaysia Premier League as a midfielder.

Career statistics

Club

References

External links
 

1987 births
Living people
Malaysian footballers
People from Terengganu
Terengganu F.C. II players
Felcra FC players
Malaysia Super League players
Malaysian people of Malay descent
Association football midfielders